Whitford  may refer to:

Places
 Electoral district of Whitford, Western Australia
 Westfield Whitford City, shopping centre in Perth, Western Australia
 Whitford, Alberta, Canada
 Whitford (provincial electoral district)
 Whitford, Devon, England
 Whitford, Flintshire, Wales
 Whitford, New Zealand
 Whitford, Pennsylvania
 Whitford station, railway station in Exton, Pennsylvania, US

People

See also
 Whiteford (disambiguation)